Food trends are widespread changes in food preferences. Some such trends prove to be long-lasting. Food trends are often discussed in magazines devoted to cuisine, and around the internet.

Duration
Although certain food trends may be more of a fad (see also Fad diet), some become long-lasting and, at times, a permanent fixture in the culture of food.  In an article in Bon Appétit the difference between a food trend versus a fad is discussed. David Saks, author of Tastemakers: Why we're crazy for cupcakes but fed up with fondue, states, "Think about extra virgin olive oil—with the gourmands it hit big in the late '70s, early '80s, and it trickled down to everyone else in the '90s. It became the 'thing.' Now it's not a trend, nobody really talks about it. But it's the default oil. Food trends last a long time and are often good."

Discussions of trends
Authorities from Bon Appétit and Food & Wine magazines to the top chefs of the world have driven and reported on these trends. For instance, Bon Appetit recently released their top 25 food trends for 2013 in their article "The BA 25: What to eat, drink, and cook in 2013", 

Pinterest and Twitter give links to sites listing what to serve this season. Pinterest is designed to display trends and food is one of their biggest categories.

Smaller, blog-style sites have also appeared; examples include Violas Pantry, Mouth from the South, The Daily Meal, and Spiced, that recruit smaller numbers of readers and provide entertaining, colloquial content to more targeted audiences.

References

Food and drink culture